The Canadian Basketball League (CBL) was a professional basketball minor league based around the Greater Toronto Area of Southern Ontario. The CBL was founded in July 2014 by former NBA coach Butch Carter.

Teams

References

External links
 CBL official website

Professional sports leagues in Canada
Basketball leagues in Canada
2014 establishments in Ontario
2017 disestablishments in Ontario
Sports leagues established in 2014
 Sports leagues disestablished in 2017